KhK Vympel is a Russian bandy club based in Korolyov, Moscow Oblast, founded in 1934. The club colours are white, red and blue. In 1963 it won the bronze in the Soviet national championship. Their stadium, called Stadium Vympel, was expecting artificial ice, However, the project was abandoned. Although an indoor ice hockey-sized arena entered the plans instead, the official reason given was financial problems.

External links
Official homepage
Team image

References

Bandy clubs in Russia
Bandy clubs in the Soviet Union
Bandy clubs established in 1934